The punto is a musical genre typical of eastern Venezuela.  It is also called punto y llanto, punto cruzado, punto fuerte and punto mampó.

See also 
Venezuelan music

Further reading
Luis Felipe Ramón y Rivera. La Música Folklórica de Venezuela. Monte Ávila, 1976.

Punto